Match of the Day from Northern Ireland is the name given to coverage of football matches involving local teams in Northern Ireland and the Northern Ireland national football team, produced and broadcast by BBC Northern Ireland.  It is shown on either BBC One Northern Ireland or BBC Two Northern Ireland depending on the match and availability in the schedule, while some of Northern Ireland's international matches have also been broadcast throughout the United Kingdom via the BBC Red Button interactive channels on Freeview and Sky Digital.

The program first broadcast in the 1980s whenever BBC NI took over international football from UTV who used to show highlights, with the matches on BBC NI there was more Live action and highlights than before.  The coverage was hosted by BBC NI sports presenters at the time including John Bennett and commentary was often done by Mark Robson.  Jackie Fullerton became main commentator in 1993 whenever he moved to BBC NI from UTV with Mark Robson going in the opposite direction.  Coverage declined in the 2008/2009 season with Northern Irelands home games on Sky Sports who bought the rights in 2008 and away games on Setanta Sports.  That season the program has been limited to Northern Ireland highlights of all games, the Home highlights were shown on the night of the game and away highlights on the night after the game due to right restrictions.  The only Northern Ireland match this season shown live on MOTD from NI was between San Marino and Northern Ireland in a 3–0 win for Northern Ireland.  MOTD from NI also covers the Co-Operative Insurance Cup and JJB Sports Cup Finals live on BBC NI and the Milk Cup.  The JJB Sports Cup has been shown live since 2000 and Co-Operative Insurance Cup since 2006 and the Milk Cup finals night has been shown since 2005.

For the 2009/2010 the coverage will again increase because of the collapse of Setanta Sports.  So, the remaining Northern Ireland away games against Poland and the Czech Republic were shown live on Match of the Day from NI and highlights of the last remaining home game will also be shown.  As well as their existing coverage of the Milk Cup, JJB Sports Cup and Co-Operative Insurance Cup.

Personalities
Presenters: Stephen Watson, Mark Sidebottom, Gavin Andrews.
Ex Hosts: Jerome Quinn, Austin O'Callahan, Jackie Fullerton (When not commentating)

Commentators:
Jackie Fullerton 1993–present
Joel Taggart 2005–present
Michael Mcnamee 2005–present
Paul Gilmour 2008–present

the other three have commentated when Jackie Fullerton was unavailable or is presenting.

Co-Commentators
The current co-commentator is usually John O'Neill.  Previous co- commentators or pundits to the program for Northern Ireland matches include Iain Dowie, Billy Hamilton and Gerry Armstrong, Alan McDonald.

Analysts
Studio analysis for Northern Ireland matches currently comes from Michael O'Neill and Jim Magilton.

Guest pundits also occur for Milk Cup, Co-Operative Insurance Cup and JJB Sports Cup Finals that is famous in the local game.  These include Stephen Baxter of Crusaders, David Jeffrey of Linfield, Liam Beckett, Chris Morgan and Marty Quinn.  These pundits vary depending if their teams are playing or not.

BBC Television shows
British sports television series
Football mass media in the United Kingdom
Association football in Northern Ireland
BBC Northern Ireland television shows